Traditionally, Islam has had a rich history of the veneration of relics, especially of those attributed to the Islamic prophet Muhammad. There exists historical evidence that some of the earliest Muslims practiced the veneration of relics, and the practice continued to remain popular in many parts of the Sunni Islamic world until the eighteenth-century, when the reform movements of Salafism and Wahhabism began to staunchly condemn such practices due to their linking it with the sin of shirk (idolatry). As a result of the influence of these perspectives, some contemporary Muslims influenced by these ideologies have rejected the traditional practice of relic-veneration altogether. The most genuine prophetic relics are believed to be those housed in Istanbul's Topkapı Palace, in a section known as Hirkai Serif Odasi (Chamber of the Holy Mantle).

The traditional Sunni attitude towards relics is concisely summarized in the words of the fourteenth-century hadith master Al-Dhahabi, who passionately sermonized: "Ahmad ibn Hanbal was asked about touching the Prophet's grave and kissing it and he saw nothing wrong with it. His son 'Abd Allāh related this from him. If it is asked: 'Why did the Prophet's Companions not do this?' We reply: 'Because they saw him with their very eyes when he was alive, enjoyed his presence directly, kissed his very hand, nearly fought each other over the remnants of his ablution water, shared his purified hair on the day of the Greater Pilgrimage, and even if he spat it would virtually not fall except into someone's hand so that he could pass it over his face. Since we have not had the tremendous fortune of sharing this, we throw ourselves on his grave as a mark of commitment, reverence, and acceptance, even to kiss it. Do you not see what Thābit al-Bunānī did when he kissed the hand of Anas ibn Malik and placed it on his face saying: 'This is the hand that touched the hand of the Messenger of God?' Muslims are not moved to these matters except by their extreme love for the Prophet, as they are ordered to love God and the Prophet more than their own lives."

The 17th-century French explorer Jean-Baptiste Tavernier wrote about his discussions with two treasurers of Constantinople, who described the standard, mantle and the seal. Two centuries later, Charles White wrote about the mantle, the standard, the beard, tooth, and footprint of Muhammad, the last of which he saw personally.

Standard
The battle standard of Muhammad, known in Turkish as Sancak-ı Şerif ("Holy Standard"), was believed to have served as the curtain over the entrance of his wife Aisha's tent. According to another tradition, the standard had been part of the turban of Buraydah ibn al-Khasib, an enemy who was ordered to attack Muhammad, but instead bowed to him, unwound his turban and affixed it to his spear, dedicating it and himself to Muhammad's service.

Selim I acquired it after the Ottoman conquest of Egypt, and had it taken to the Grand Mosque of Damascus where it was to be carried during the annual Hajj pilgrimage to Mecca. Realising its political possibilities, Murad III had it sent to Hungary as an incentive for his army.

In 1595, Mehmed III had it brought to Topkapı Palace, where it was sewn into another standard, alleged to be Umar's and together they were encased in a rosewood box, inlaid with gems including tortoiseshell and mother of pearl. The keys to the box were traditionally held by the Kizlar Agha.

It became associated with the Ottoman Empire, and was exhibited whenever the Sultan or Grand Vizier appeared before the field army, such as at the 1826 Auspicious Incident and at the outset of Turkey's entrance into World War I.

Tavernier reported that the Lance was kept outside the Sultan's bedroom in the 17th century, by 1845 White said he saw it resting against a wall near the standard and by 1920 its whereabouts were unknown.

Holy Mantle

The Holy Mantle, Hırka-i Şerif, or Burda is an item of clothing that was given as a gift by Muhammad to Ka'b ibn Zuhayr, whose children sold it to Muawiyah I, the founder of the Umayyad dynasty. After the fall of the Umayyads, the Mantle went to Baghdad under the Abbasids, to Cairo under the Mamluks, and finally moved by Selim I to Topkapi Palace in 1595.

The Poem of the Mantle was composed by Imam al-Busiri in praise of Muhammad and the mantle.

Tavernier described it as a white coat made of goat's hair with large sleeves, or a cream fabric with black wool lines.

The Grand Seignor having taken it out of the Coffer, kisses it with much respect, and puts it into the hands of the Capi-Aga, who is come into the Room by his Order, after they had taken the Impressions of the Seal. The Officer sends to the Overseer of the Treasury, for a large golden Cauldron, which is brought in thither by some of the Senior-Pages. It is so capacious, according to the description which they gave me of it, as to contain the sixth part of a Tun, and the out-side of it is gamish'd, in some places, with Emeralds, and Turquezes. This Vessel is fill'd with water within six fingers breadth of the brink, and the Capi-Aga, having put Mahomet's Garment into it, and left it to soak a little while, takes it out again, and wrings it hard, to get out the water it has imbib'd, which falls into the Cauldron, taking great care that there falls not any of it to the ground. That done, with the said water he fills a great number of Venice-Chrystl Bottles, containing about half a pint, and when he has stopp'd them, he Seals them with the Grand Seignor's Seal. They afterwards set the Garment a drying, till the twentieth day of the Ratnazan, and then his Highness comes to see them put [it] up again in the Coffer.

Sacred Seal

The Sacred seal, or Mühr-ü Şerif in Turkish, was reported by Tavernier, who said it was kept in a small ebony box in a niche cut in the wall by the foot of a divan in the relic room at Topkapi.

The seal itself is encased in crystal, approximately 3"x4", with a border of ivory. It has been used as recently as the 17th century to stamp documents.

According to Muslim historiographical tradition, Muhammad's original seal was inherited by Abu Bakr, Umar, and Uthman, but lost by Uthman in a well in Medina. Uthman is said to have made a replica of the seal, and this seal was supposedly found in the capture of Baghdad (1534) and brought to Istanbul.

Beard of Muhammad
Known in the Ottoman language as the Sakal-ı Şerif, the beard was said to have been removed from Muhammad's face by his favorite barber in the presence of Abu Bakr, Ali and several others. Individual hairs were later taken away, but the beard itself is kept in a glass case.

Tooth of Muhammad
Muhammad lost four teeth at the Battle of Uhud, after being struck with a battle axe. Two of the teeth were supposedly lost, one was preserved at Topkapi, and another was held by Mehmed II.

Blessed Sandals
The Blessed Sandals, Nalain Shareef in Urdu, have traditionally been used to gain the blessings of Muhammad.

Muhammad's Bowl
A 1400-year-old bowl used by Muhammad which after his death was kept by his daughter Fatimah and her husband Ali, the fourth Caliph and Muhammad's cousin. After their death, the bowl was kept by their children Hasan and Hussein. The bowl was passed from generation to generation by descendants of Muhammad until it finally reached Britain. On 21 September 2011 the bowl was delivered to Chechnya and now is kept in "Heart of Chechnya" Mosque named after Ahmad Haji Kadyrov in Grozny.

Regarding the bowl, Ibn Kathir, the Islamic scholar and commentator on the Qur'an, writes in his book Wives of the Prophet Muhammad:

Hadithic references to physical blessings from Muhammad

A number of hadith refer to blessings resulting from physical contact with Muhammad's person, or bodily fluids. Generally in Islam, Muhammad is the only person who people can seek blessings from, whether through his body, what touches his body or bodily fluids. And here are some hadiths that mention only some his blessings:

Narrated Usayd ibn Hudayr:

Abu Musa said:

Narrated Al-Miswar bin Makhrama and Marwan (an excerpt from a long hadith):

Narrated Abu Juhaifa:

Anas b. Malik reported:

Narrated Asma:

Anas b. Malik reported:

See also
 Ashtiname of Muhammad
 Bayt al-Mawlid, the house where Muhammad is believed to have been born
 Cloak of Muhammad
 Possessions of Muhammad
 Seal of Muhammad
 Letters of Muhammad
 Relics associated with Buddha
 Relics associated with Jesus

References

Further reading
 Patrizi, Luca, "Relics of the Prophet", in Muhammad in History, Thought, and Culture: An Encyclopedia of the Prophet of God (two vols.), Edited by C. Fitzpatrick and A. Walker, Santa Barbara, ABC-CLIO, 2014.

External links

 Prophet Muhammad's relics arrived in Chechnya

Muhammad
Muhammad
Muhammad